"Wig-Wam Bam" is a song by British glam rock band The Sweet, written by songwriters Nicky Chinn and Mike Chapman, released as a single in September 1972. It was the first Sweet single on which the band members actually played their instruments, as previous singles featured producer Phil Wainman on drums, and session musicians John Roberts and Pip Williams (later producer of Status Quo albums) on bass and guitars respectively.

Lyrics 
The song's lyrics are inspired by Henry Longfellow's Hiawatha poem from 1855. The poem tells the legend of a Native American warrior Hiawatha and his lover Minnehaha. The lyrics also refer to Running Bear and his lover Little White Dove, two characters from the 1959 song "Running Bear" written by Jiles Perry Richardson.

Music 
The song featured a significant change in the band's sound, and is often considered the band's first glam rock single. Also, this was the first Sweet single with bass player Steve Priest singing some parts of the lead vocal: the "try a little touch, try a little too much" line at the chorus. This became an important part of Sweet's style later, and at most of their later singles, they also used this technique, with Priest singing some lines of the song. After the song became a hit, Sweet adopted a glam image, starting to wear glitter and makeup.

The band appeared on BBC's Top of the Pops, performing the song, three times in 1972: on 14 September, on 21 September and on 5 October, with Priest wearing an extravagant Native American feathered headress.

Personnel 
Brian Connolly - lead vocals
Steve Priest - bass guitar, backing vocals, lead vocals
Andy Scott - guitar, backing vocals
Mick Tucker - drums, backing vocals

Chart performance
The song reached No. 4 in the UK singles chart in September 1972.

Cover versions 
 In 1986 a cover by English pop band Black Lace was released as a single and reached #63 on the UK music charts.
 In 1989 a cover by English pop musician Damian was released as a single and reached #49 on the UK music charts.
 In 2000 all-female rock band The Donnas recorded a cover (with different, suggestive lyrics and no references to Hiwawatha) for the compilations  Runnin' on Fumes!/The Gearhead Magazine Singles Compilation and Blockbuster: A 70's Glitter Glam Rock Experience.  It was later released as a single in 2002.
 In 2000 Swedish Band Star/Starz!?, under Starz!? released a cover on their album Party, and on Enhanced Single Wig Wam Bam.
 In 2010 all-female Finnish hard rock band Barbe-Q-Barbies released a cover on the album All over You.

In other media 
The song was featured in the 2023 Hulu series Welcome to Chippendales.

References 

1972 songs
1972 singles
The Sweet songs
Songs about Native Americans
Songs written by Mike Chapman
Songs written by Nicky Chinn
Song recordings produced by Phil Wainman
RCA Records singles